Embu das Artes, previously and commonly known simply as Embu, is a Brazilian municipality in the State of São Paulo. It is part of the Metropolitan Region of São Paulo. The population is 276,535 (2020 est.) in an area of 70.40 km2.

Its history brought it an unexpected specialization as a city for artists. This has paid tourism dividends to the city.

History 
The history of Embu began in 1554, with the arrival of a group of Jesuits of the aldeamento or settlement of Bohi, later M'Boy, halfway between the sea and the São Paulo hinterlands. As the Jesuit missions in the interior of Brazil, the primary objective was to convert the native population to Roman Catholicism, in an attempt to use them as farm workers in the region.

In 1607 the lands of the village passed to the hands of Fernão Dias (uncle of the bandeirante Fernão Dias, the emerald hunter), In 1690, the priest Belchior de Pontes initiated the construction of the Igreja do Rosário (the Church of the Rosary), when it transferred at the same time to the nucleus of the original village.  In 1760, by order of the Portuguese Crown, the Jesuits were expelled from Brazil because of their interference in colonist affairs, such as protecting converted natives from the Bandeiras, which sought to enslave them.

The artistic vocation of the city started to project itself in 1937, when Cássio M'Boy, "santeiro" – sculptor of religious images – in Embu, gained first prize on the Exposition Internationel d'Arts Techniques du Paris. Before that, Cássio had been the professor of some renowned artists and received illustrious representatives of the Modernismo movement of 1922, including Anita Malfatti, Tarsila do Amaral, Oswald de Andrade, Menotti Del Picchia, Volpi and Yoshio Takaoka.

One of Cássio M'Boy's most successful disciples was Sakai do Embu, internationally known and one of the greatest Brazilian ceramist-sculptors. In 1962, Sakai formed the Solano Trindade group of plastic artists, highly influenced by African-Brazilian art and the religious tradition of the Yoruba orishahs.

The artistic tradition of Embu is an institution with projects and events done both in Brazil and abroad since 1964. The Feira de Artes and Artesanato do Embu (Arts and Handicraft of Embu) was launched in the late 1960s and it has been attracting tourists and revenues to the city ever since.

One of the top Nazi torturers, Josef Mengele was buried in the Nossa Senhora do Rosario cemetery in Embu under his false identity, Wolfgang Gerhard, as the southern region of the city of São Paulo and its borders are known for a sizable German-Brazilian population.

References

External links 

  City of Embu das Artes Home Page
  Embu das Artes Tourism Office home page
  Brazil Tourism Office Home Page
  Encontra Embu – Find everything about Embu das Artes city

Municipalities in São Paulo (state)
Populated places established in 1554
1554 establishments in the Portuguese Empire